The Secret of Johann Orth is a 1932 German historical drama film directed by Willi Wolff and starring Karl Ludwig Diehl, Ellen Richter and Paul Wegener. It was shot at the Johannisthal Studios in Berlin and on location in Austria. The film's sets were designed by the art director Hans Sohnle and Otto Erdmann.

Cast

See also
 The Secret of Satana Magarita (1921)
 A Vanished World (1922)

References

Bibliography 
 Grange, William. Cultural Chronicle of the Weimar Republic. Scarecrow Press, 2008.

External links 
 

1932 films
Films of the Weimar Republic
German historical drama films
1930s historical drama films
1930s German-language films
Films directed by Willi Wolff
Films set in the 19th century
Tobis Film films
German black-and-white films
1932 drama films
1930s German films
Films shot at Johannisthal Studios